Vitringa is a surname. Notable people with the surname include:

 Campegius Vitringa (1659–1722), Dutch theologian
 Wigerus Vitringa (1657–1725), Dutch painter